A-Haunting We Will Go may refer to:

 A-Haunting We Will Go (1942 film), a 1942 Laurel and Hardy comedy film
 A Haunting We Will Go (1949 film), a 1949 animated short directed by Seymour Kneitel
 A-Haunting We Will Go (1966 film), a 1966 theatrical Looney Tunes cartoon
 A-Haunting We Will Go (play), a 1981 play by Tim Kelly